Howard Burns is a British architectural historian who is professor emeritus of architectural history at the Scuola Normale Superiore, Pisa. He has also lectured at the Courtauld Institute of Art and was Slade Professor of Fine Art at the University of Cambridge 1977-78. He is a specialist in the architecture of Andrea Palladio and is a member of the Accademia Olimpica and the Accademia di San Luca.

Biography 
Burns was born in 1939 in Aberdeen, Scotland.

Education 
He attended Westminster School in London and moved on to study history at King’s College, Cambridge, where he was awarded a B.A. At Cambridge he co-edited Delta magazine with Simon Gray, the now famous playwright. Two influences during Burns’ undergraduate years were the lecturer John Saltmarsh, whose specialism was in medieval economic and social history, and the scholar, Robert Ralph Bolgar, author of The Classical Heritage.

Burns focused on Renaissance architects and their study of the antique for his postgraduate studies at the Courtauld Institute of Art, London.  He was supervised by Peter Murray who, at the time, was Librarian at the Conway Library.

Academic life 
By the late 1960s Burns was teaching History of Art at Cambridge University using his own colour images of Italian architecture in his lectures. Anthony Blunt, Director of the Courtauld Institute, came to hear of Burns’ talent and encouraged him to teach at the Courtauld. By 1969 he was a lecturer there and this brought him into contact with a number of eminent art historians. such as John Shearman, Michael Hirst and Jennifer Fletcher.  In 1986 Burns moved to a professorship at Harvard University in the Graduate School of Design. Italy, long his passion, became Burns' next destination taking a professorial position at the University of Ferrara in 1994.  A year later he went over to the University of Venice. In 1993 Burns was appointed “Presidente of the Consiglio Scientifico of CISAAP, the Palladio Centre in Vicenza. Burns’ most recent post has been to a chair in architectural history at the Scoula Normale Superiore di Pisa.

Burns is still active.  He gave a lecture entitled ‘Unforced Elegance’  held the Art History Institute, Florence on 25 November 2019 and was due to appear at the 33rd International Seminar on the History of Architecture, Naples and the Renaissance, at CISAAP, Andrea Palladio, Vicenza, between 18–20 May 2020. A short video clip of Burns discussing Palladio's relevance today gives some insight into Burns' expertise on the great architect.

Legacy 
Burns has another connection to the Conway Library at the Courtauld Institute, London.  As part of a wider project, 'Courtauld Connects', the Library’s collection of over a million photographic prints, glass and film negatives are currently being digitised.  Photographs attributed to Burns are to be found amongst them.

Curated exhibitions 
Palladio, London, 1975.
Raphael, Rome, 1984. 
Giulio Romano, Mantua, 1989.
Francesco di Giorgio, Siena, 1993.
Palladio, Vicenza, London (Royal Academy), Barcelona and Madrid, 2008/09. (with Guido Beltramini)

Selected publications
Andrea Palladio 1508-1580: The portico and the farmyard. Arts Council of Great Britain, 1975. 
Palladio and Northern Europe: Books, travellers, architects. Skira Editore, 1999. (With Guido Beltramini) 
Palladio. Royal Academy of Arts, London, 2009. (With Guido Beltramini) 
La villa italiana del Rinascimento. Forme e funzioni delle residenze di campagna, dal castello alla villa palladiana. Colla Editore, 2012.

References 

Academics of the University of Cambridge
Academics of the Courtauld Institute of Art
Academic staff of the Scuola Normale Superiore di Pisa
British architectural historians
British art historians
British expatriates in Italy